Papyrus 113 (in the Gregory-Aland numbering), designated by 𝔓113, is a fragment of an early copy of a section of the New Testament in Greek. It comes from a papyrus manuscript of the Epistle to the Romans. The surviving text features parts of Romans 2:12-13 on one side of the fragment and parts of 2:29 on the other.

The manuscript paleographically has been assigned by the INTF to the 3rd century. Comfort dated it to the first half of the 3rd century. 
The manuscript is currently housed at the Papyrology Rooms, of the Sackler Library at Oxford University with the shelf number P. Oxy. 4497.

Text 
Although Comfort stated that the Greek text of this codex is too small to determine its textual character, word-spacing analysis indicates that it contained the Alexandrian omission of του in verse 13.

No readings to be added.

See also 

 List of New Testament papyri
 Oxyrhynchus Papyri

References

Further reading 

 W. E. H. Cockle, The Oxyrhynchus Papyri LXVI (London: 1999), pp. 7–8.

External links

Images 
 P.Oxy.LXIV 4497 from Papyrology at Oxford's "POxy: Oxyrhynchus Online" 
 Image from 𝔓113 recto, fragment of Romans 2:12-13 
 Image from 𝔓113 verso, fragment of Romans 2:29

Official registration 
 "Continuation of the Manuscript List" Institute for New Testament Textual Research, University of Münster. Retrieved April 9, 2008

New Testament papyri
3rd-century biblical manuscripts
Early Greek manuscripts of the New Testament
Epistle to the Romans papyri